Sphinx is a remote patch of snow in Cairngorms National Park on Braeriach, Scotland's (and the UK's) third-highest mountain, which is historically known for its semi-permanent year-round longevity; to date it has entirely melted only in 1933, 1959, 1996, 2003, 2006, 2017, 2018, 2021, and 2022. Named for a nearby climbing route, it was first noted by members of the Scottish Mountaineering Club in the 1840s, and is thought by scientists to have fully melted in the 18th century, given the climatic and meteorological records. More generally, Garbh Choire Mor is Scotland's snowiest corrie, where snow typically persists into the summer months. Declining snow cover has persisted in the area since the winter of 1983-1984.

References

Mountains and hills of Scotland
Highlands and Islands of Scotland